Volonté may refer to:

Claudio Volonté (1934 – 1977), Italian actor
Dernière Volonté, French musician
Eraldo Volonté (1918 – 2003), Italian saxophonist
Gian Maria Volonté (1933 – 1994), Italian actor
Des Fleurs de bonne volonté, an 1890 work by French poet Jules Laforgue 
La volonté de paix, a French journal
Le Triomphe de la volonté, a 1935 Nazi propaganda film
4921 Volonté, a minor planet